The 1939 Army Cadets football team represented the United States Military Academy in the 1939 college football season. In their second year under head coach William H. Wood, the Cadets compiled a  record and outscored their opponents by a combined total of 106 to 105.  In the annual Army–Navy Game, the Midshipmen  The Cadets' three other losses came against Yale, Notre Dame, and Harvard. 
 
Army tackle Harry Stella was selected by the United Press (UP), International News Service (INS), and Newsweek magazine as a first-team player on the All-America team.

Schedule

References

Army
Army Black Knights football seasons
Army Cadets football